Hattie J. Peeples House is a historic home located at Varnville, Hampton County, South Carolina. It was built between 1889 and 1893, and is an L-shaped, two-story, five-bay, Italianate-style dwelling.  It has a gable roof and weatherboard siding. It features a projecting pavilion, encircling porch, and textured wall surfaces in the Queen Anne style.  Also on the property are a frame and weatherboard butler's quarters (1885); and a brick building built to replace an earlier frame structure destroyed by a fire in 1917. This building served as a post office from the time of its construction about 1920 until 1964. Hattie J. Peeples served for more than 30 years as postmistress.

It was listed on the National Register of Historic Places in 1992.

References

Houses on the National Register of Historic Places in South Carolina
Italianate architecture in South Carolina
Queen Anne architecture in South Carolina
Houses completed in 1893
National Register of Historic Places in Hampton County, South Carolina
Houses in Hampton County, South Carolina